The Gregori Aminoff Prize is an international prize awarded since 1979 by the Royal Swedish Academy of Sciences in the field of crystallography, rewarding "a documented, individual contribution in the field of crystallography, including areas concerned with the dynamics of the formation and dissolution of crystal structures. Some preference should be shown for work evincing elegance in the approach to the problem."

The prize, which is named in memory of the Swedish scientist and artist Gregori Aminoff (1883–1947), Professor of Mineralogy at the Swedish Museum of Natural History from 1923, was endowed through a bequest by his widow Birgit Broomé-Aminoff. The prize can be shared by several winners. It is considered the Nobel prize for crystallography.

Recipients of the Prize
Source: Royal Swedish Academy of Science

See also

 List of chemistry awards
 List of physics awards

References

Notes

A. The form and spelling of the names in the name column is according to www.kva.se, the official website of the Royal Swedish Academy of Sciences. Alternative spellings and name forms, where they exist, are given at the articles linked from this column.

B. The information in the country column is according to www.kva.se, the official website of the Royal Swedish Academy of Sciences. This information may not necessarily reflect the recipient's birthplace or citizenship.

C. The information in the institution column is according to www.kva.se, the official website of the Royal Swedish Academy of Sciences. This information may not necessarily reflect the recipient's current institution.

D. The citation for each award is quoted (not always in full) www.kva.se, the official website of the Royal Swedish Academy of Sciences. The links in this column are to articles (or sections of articles) on the history and areas of physics for which the awards were presented. The links are intended only as a guide and explanation. For a full account of the work done by each prize winner, please see the biography articles linked from the name column.

Citations

External links
awardee of the Gregori Aminoff Prize

Awards of the Royal Swedish Academy of Sciences
Chemistry awards
Crystallography awards
Physics awards
Awards established in 1979